Alvydas Pazdrazdis (born 20 July 1972) is a Lithuanian former basketball player from Kretinga, Lithuania, who won the bronze medal with the Lithuania national basketball team at the 1992 Summer Olympics.  He is currently a scout for the Dallas Mavericks. His former clubs include Statyba Vilnius, Neptūnas Klaipėda and Sakalai Vilnius. He retired as a player at the age of 28. In June 2011, he became an NBA champion as a scout with the Dallas Mavericks. He played collegiately at McNeese State University.

References

External links
databaseOlympics
Profile

1972 births
Living people
Basketball players at the 1992 Summer Olympics
BC Statyba players
Lithuanian men's basketball players
Lithuanian expatriate basketball people in the United States
McNeese Cowboys basketball players
Medalists at the 1992 Summer Olympics
BC Neptūnas players
Olympic basketball players of Lithuania
Olympic bronze medalists for Lithuania
Olympic medalists in basketball
Small forwards
Sportspeople from Kretinga